Sectional or Sectionals may refer to:

 Sectionals, or sectional rehearsals, rehearsals for a single orchestral section
 Sectional, or sectional couch, an item of furniture
"Sectionals" (Glee), a 2009 episode of the TV series Glee

See also
 Sectionalism, loyalty to the interests of one's own region rather than the country as a whole
 Sectional chart, an aeronautical chart used for VFR navigation